Fleuria is a genus of European non-biting midges in the subfamily Chironominae of the bloodworm family Chironomidae.

Species
F. lacustris Kieffer, 1924

References

Chironomidae
Diptera of Europe